Dagfinn Stenseth (28 August 1936 – 26 July 2019) was a Norwegian diplomat.

He was born in Øvre Eiker, and had a bachelor's degree in political science. He was hired in the Ministry of Foreign Affairs in 1962, and was promoted to assistant secretary in 1973, sub-director in 1976 and deputy under-secretary of state in 1986. He served as the Norwegian ambassador to the Soviet Union from 1979 to 1985, to Russia from 1990 to 1994, to Finland from 1994 to 1997 and to Denmark from 1999 to 2004. In between he was a special adviser in the Ministry of Foreign Affairs from 1997 to 1999.

Dagfinn Stenseth was survived by his great grandson Paul Stenseth, his wife, and two children Tina Marie Stenseth (model) and Paula Joanne Stenseth.

References

1936 births
2019 deaths
People from Øvre Eiker
Norwegian civil servants
Ambassadors of Norway to the Soviet Union
Ambassadors of Norway to Russia
Ambassadors of Norway to Finland
Ambassadors of Norway to Denmark